The following lists events that happened during 1976 in Singapore.

Incumbents
President: Benjamin Henry Sheares
Prime Minister: Lee Kuan Yew

Events

April
1 April – The Singapore Corporation of Rehabilitative Enterprises (SCORE) is formed to help ex-offenders find employment.

June
 June - The Pearl Bank Apartments is completed, making it Singapore's tallest and densest residential building in Singapore at that time. The Apartments will soon be demolished after being sold to CapitaLand in an en-bloc sale in 2018, which will be redeveloped into One Pearl Bank by 2023.

October
1 October -
The OCBC Centre is officially opened.
The Business Times is launched.

December
23 December – The PAP wins all 69 seats in the 1976 General Election.

Date unknown
 The Queensway Shopping Centre is opened as a sports mall. The mall also hosts Singapore's first public escalators.
 St James Power Station was decommissioned and its operations is taken over by Pasir Panjang and Jurong power stations.

Births
20 January – Jamus Lim, Singaporean politician.
15 July – Desmond Lee, Minister for National Development.
2 August – Pritam Singh, Leader of the Opposition and Singaporean politician.
2 December – Loretta Chen, theatre director and media personality.

Deaths
4 October – Chua Boon Lay, footballer (b. 1902).

References

 
Singapore
Years in Singapore